The 1940–41 season was Real Madrid Club de Fútbol's 38th season in existence and the club's 9th consecutive season in the top flight of Spanish football.

Summary
The club changed its president on 27 November 1940 with the arrival of Antonio Santos. Also, on 1 January 1941 the club changed its name from Madrid Football Club back to Real Madrid Club de Futbol, recovering its honorific title that had been stripped by the Second Spanish Republic in 1931. In spite of the transfers in of Alday and Chus Alonso, the team collapsed to the 6th spot during the final rounds under the management of Paco Bru, nine points below Champions Atletico Aviación.

Squad

Transfers

Competitions

La Liga

Position by round

League table

Matches

Copa del Generalísimo

President's Cup of the Castellana Federation

Statistics

Squad statistics

Players statistics

References

Real Madrid CF seasons
Real Madrid CF